Mani is a village and a community in the municipality of Didymoteicho in the Evros regional unit, Greece. It is situated near the left bank of the river Erythropotamos, 2 km west of Karoti, 4 km northeast of Kyani and 10 km northwest of Didymoteicho town centre. In 2011 its population was 385 for the village and 538 for the community, which includes the villages Evgeniko and Sitaria. Its elevation is 55 m. The current town of Mani was founded by Maniot Greeks who fought under the King of Greece against the Republic of Turkey and Kemal Atatürk during the 1920s.

Population

See also

List of settlements in the Evros regional unit

External links
Mani at the GTP Travel Pages

Didymoteicho
Populated places in Evros (regional unit)